Alex Gibb was an Australian professional soccer player who played as many half-back roles with Queensland clubs and was captained for the Australia national team. Gibb is recognised as Australia's first international captain and was awarded retrospectively by Football Federation Australia cap number 1 for Australia's first match against New Zealand.

Early life
Gibb was born in Leinster, Ireland, but was raised to Scottish parents in Musselburgh. He played at local clubs Musselburgh Union, Newton Grange and Musselburgh Athletic. He migrated to Ipswich, Queensland in 1911.

Club career
In a career lasting over twenty years, In 1913, he played for the Queensland state side to play against the New South Wales state team in a two-match series. Gibb played for a number of Queensland clubs including Bundamba Athletic, Bundamba Rangers and South Brisbane Scottish. He had left the Bundamba Rangers and was transferred to South Brisbane Scottish as a player-coach on 22 March 1923.

International career
At age 34, Gibb began his international career playing through a 14-match tour with Australia playing in central midfield and right-half positions. He made his international debut for Australia in June 1922 in Australia's first recognised international match, against New Zealand. Gibb played six matches for Australia between 1922 and 1923, playing as captain in all of those matches where he had played in Australia's first international win.

Managerial career
After the end of his club career, Gibb managed many Australian state teams and became a selector of Australia in 1936.

Outside football
Gibb was a secretary for the Booval Bowling Club.

Personal life

Family and relationships
Alex Gibb married Margaret Allan in November 1911   children Margret, Lex, Alan, Alf and Mary born in Ipswich.

Gibb's brother, Aired died at age 53 in October 1939. His mother, Mary Rennie Gibb had then died at age 91 in February 1951 in Yonkers, New York.

Career statistics

International

Honours
In 2000 Gibb was inducted to the Australian Football Hall of Fame.

References

Australian soccer players
Year of birth missing
Year of death missing
Association football wing halves
Australia international soccer players